Hypognatha is a genus of orb-weaver spiders first described by F. E. Guérin-Méneville in 1839.

Species
 it contains thirty-eight species:
Hypognatha alho Levi, 1996 – Brazil
Hypognatha belem Levi, 1996 – Brazil
Hypognatha cacau Levi, 1996 – Peru, Brazil
Hypognatha cambara Levi, 1996 – Brazil
Hypognatha carpish Levi, 1996 – Peru
Hypognatha colosso Levi, 1996 – Colombia, Brazil
Hypognatha coyo Levi, 1996 – Colombia
Hypognatha cryptocephala Mello-Leitão, 1947 – Brazil
Hypognatha deplanata (Taczanowski, 1873) – Brazil, French Guiana
Hypognatha divuca Levi, 1996 – Peru
Hypognatha elaborata Chickering, 1953 – Costa Rica, Panama, Colombia
Hypognatha furcifera (O. Pickard-Cambridge, 1881) – Brazil
Hypognatha ica Levi, 1996 – Colombia, Brazil
Hypognatha ituara Levi, 1996 – Brazil
Hypognatha jacaze Levi, 1996 – Brazil
Hypognatha janauari Levi, 1996 – Brazil
Hypognatha lagoas Levi, 1996 – Brazil
Hypognatha lamoka Levi, 1996 – Venezuela
Hypognatha maranon Levi, 1996 – Peru
Hypognatha maria Levi, 1996 – Peru
Hypognatha matisia Levi, 1996 – Peru
Hypognatha mirandaribeiroi Soares & Camargo, 1948 – Brazil
Hypognatha mozamba Levi, 1996 – Colombia, Ecuador, Peru, Brazil
Hypognatha nasuta O. Pickard-Cambridge, 1896 – Mexico
Hypognatha navio Levi, 1996 – Venezuela, Brazil
Hypognatha pereiroi Levi, 1996 – Brazil
Hypognatha putumayo Levi, 1996 – Colombia, Ecuador
Hypognatha rancho Levi, 1996 – Venezuela
Hypognatha saut Levi, 1996 – French Guiana
Hypognatha scutata (Perty, 1833) – Trinidad to Argentina
Hypognatha solimoes Levi, 1996 – Brazil
Hypognatha tampo Levi, 1996 – Peru
Hypognatha testudinaria (Taczanowski, 1879) – Peru
Hypognatha tingo Levi, 1996 – Peru
Hypognatha tocantins Levi, 1996 – Brazil
Hypognatha triunfo Levi, 1996 – Brazil
Hypognatha utari Levi, 1996 – Brazil
Hypognatha viamao Levi, 1996 – Brazil

References

Araneidae
Araneomorphae genera
Spiders of Central America
Spiders of Mexico
Spiders of South America